Sŏbongsan station (West Pongsan station) is a railway station located in Pongsan-ŭp, Pongsan County, North Hwanghae Province, North Korea. It is the terminus of the Pongsan Line of the Korean State Railway.  It is a freight-only station serving the February 8 Cement Complex, one of the largest cement factories in the DPRK.

References

Railway stations in North Korea